California Proposition 99 can refer to:
 California Proposition 99 (1988), ballot proposition for adding a tax on tobacco
 California Proposition 99 (2008), ballot proposition for limiting certain uses of eminent domain